Cephetola kakamegae is a butterfly in the family Lycaenidae. It is found in the Democratic Republic of the Congo and Kenya.

References

Butterflies described in 1999
Poritiinae